Meera Vasudevan is an Indian actress, who has mainly appeared in films and TV soap's in Malayalam, Tamil, Hindi and Telugu language. She received the Tamil Nadu State Film Award Special Prize in 2005  and the Kerala State Television Award for Best Actress in 2007. Currently she is playing a main lead role in the popular Malayalam soap opera Kudumbavilakku telecasting on Asianet .

Early life

Meera was born in Mumbai, Maharashtra in a Tamil family as the eldest daughter to Vasudevan and Hemalatha. She has one younger sister Ashwini, who shot to fame as a child artist for Jaanam Samjha Karo a Salman Khan starrer. After graduating with a bachelor's degree in arts,  Psychology and English literature, she became a successful model, appearing in many ad films, shooting into fame. The ICC setmax campaign was her call to success and marked  her entry into acting.

Career 

Her entry into the film industry happened through the 2003 Hindi satirical film Rules: Pyaar Ka Superhit Formula, alongside Milind Soman. After about 4 years of failed screen tests, the Setmax ad shot by Prahlad Kakkar won the best ad campaign of the year, and was noticed by the director Parvati Balagopalan's mother and got her a screen test for Rules: Pyaar Ka Superhit Formula, for which she was nominated for best upcoming actress by Screen Awards and Sansui – PNC Awards. Her Telugu film Golmaal , however, released first. The same year she made her film debut in the Tamil film industry as well, appearing in Samuthirakani's directorial debut Unnai Saranadainthen, in which she shared screen space with Venkat Prabhu and S. P. B. Charan. Her portrayal of Bobby, an adamant village girl, in the film, was appreciated by critics and earned her the Tamil Nadu State Film Special Award for Best Actress.

After unsuccessful films like Anjali I Love You in Telugu and Arivumani in Tamil, she stepped into the Malayalam film industry in 2005 with the Blessy-directed Thanmathra, alongside Malayalam actor Mohanlal. Her performance as Lekha Ramesan, a housewife and mother of two children, received positive reviews and she received the Best Female New Face Award at the 2005 Ujala-Asianet Awards.

In 2006, she again starred in a Hindi film, Jaadu Sa Chal Gayaa, after 3 years, following which she appeared in the Tamil comedy film Jerry as a police inspector and the Malayalam drama film Oruvan, in which she again enacted the role of a housewife. Meera next starred in a number of Malayalam-language films, which include Ekantham, Valmeekam and Kaakki and two Hindi-language films, Chain Kulii Ki Main Kulii and Thodi Life Thoda Magic in 2007. Simultaneously she made her television debut in Tamil and Malayalam with Penn and Kanalpoovu respectively . The later series earned her the Kerala State Television Award for Best Actress making her a prominent figure in television and films along Malayali audience.

In 2009, she had three releases, the Malayalam-language films Orkkuka Vallappozhum, Decent Parties and Vairam: Fight For Justice, in which she portrayed a Malayali housewife, whose daughter gets molested and killed. The fourth release was Aattanayagan, co-starring Sakthi Vasu and Remya Nambeeshan. 
After a hiatus she made her comeback to Malayalam films in 2017 with Chakkaramaavin Kombathu and later portrayed notable roles in offbeat films like Silence, appuvinte sathyanveshanam, Paykappal and Panigrahanam. In 2020, she moved her focus to television playing the female lead Sumithra in Malayalam television serial Kudumbavilakku on Asianet and antagonist in Tamil series Chithi-2 on Sun TV which rose her popularity again among the south Indian audience.

Personal life

Meera married Vishal Agarwal, son of cinematographer Ashok Kumar in 2005. They divorced in July 2010. In 2012, she married Malayalam actor John Kokken, with whom she has a son and got separated in 2016.

Filmography

Television

Serials

Shows

Commercials
Commercials appeared in from 2003 till present date
 Videocon internet TV with Shah Rukh Khan by UTV, Deven Khote
 Fair & Lovely by Nirvana films, Prakash Varma
 Kenstar by Red ice prodn, E. Niwas
 Knorr soup by mindscreen, Rajiv Menon
 ICC World Cup Cricket Rangoli by genesis prodns, Prahlad Kakkar
 Reliance R-World with Virendra Sehwag by Apocalypse films; Pradeep Sarcar
 Coke with Vikram by mindscreen, Rajiv Menon
 Fair & Lovely Talc by UTV, Deven Khote
 Chennai Silks by J.D. & Jerry
 Surf Excel by VKP, Trends
 Alpenliebe by Keroscene films
 Pears junior by Black Magic prodns
 Pilsbury '2010 feb (now on air) by Narayan, for Fingerprint films
 Hosting Discovery travel and living, Indian rendezvous with Chennai as the celebrity anchor for Discovery Channel
 Pankajakasthuri Breathe Eazy
 Setmax
 Kodak
 Kudumbashree
 Vanitha Magazine
 Arogya Masika
 Kaarthika - Hairwash powder
 Hyra Foods

Awards 

Kerala State Television Awards
2007 : Kerala State Television Award for Best Actor in a Lead role - Female - Kanalpoovu

References

External links 
 

21st-century Indian actresses
Indian film actresses
Tamil actresses
Actresses in Hindi cinema
Female models from Mumbai
Living people
Actresses in Malayalam cinema
Actresses in Tamil cinema
Year of birth missing (living people)
Tamil Nadu State Film Awards winners
Actresses from Mumbai
Actresses in Telugu cinema
Kerala State Television Award winners
Actors from Mumbai
Actresses in Tamil television
Actresses in Malayalam television
Actresses in Hindi television